Noboa is a surname in the Spanish language. It is an alternative form of the more common surname Novoa.

 Christian Noboa Tello (born 1985), Ecuadorian football player
 Diana Margarita Noboa Gordon, Miss Ecuador, 1994
 Diego Noboa y Arteta (1789–1870), President of Ecuador from 1850 to 1851
 Álvaro Noboa (born 1950), Ecuadorian politician
 Gustavo Noboa (born 1937), President of Ecuador from 2000 to 2003
 Isabel Noboa (born 1946), Ecuadorian businessperson, brother of Álvaro Noboa
 Junior Noboa (born 1964), Dominican baseball player
 Daniel Noboa Landaeta (born 1979), Spanish photographer